Monopis jacobsi is a species of moth in the family Tineidae. It is found in Nigeria. It was described by Hungarian entomologist László Anthony Gozmány in 1967.

References

Endemic fauna of Nigeria
Moths described in 1967
Tineinae
Moths of Africa